Umberto Scarpelli (25 May 1904 – 15 May 1980) was an Italian screenwriter and film director. He was assistant director on more than fifteen films and directed five films.

Selected filmography

References

External links 

1904 births
1980 deaths
Italian film directors